USS LST-939 was an  in the United States Navy. Like many of her class, she was not named and is properly referred to by her hull designation.

Construction
LST-939 was laid down on 21 July 1944, at Hingham, Massachusetts, by the Bethlehem-Hingham Shipyard; launched on 23 August 1944; sponsored by Mrs. William Lovett; and commissioned on 14 September 1944.

Service history
During World War II LST-939 was assigned to the Asiatic-Pacific theater and participated in the assault and occupation of Okinawa Gunto from April through June 1945.

Following the war, she performed occupation duty in the Far East and saw service in China until mid-March 1946. Upon her return to the United States, she was decommissioned on 22 June 1946, and struck from the Navy list on 31 July, that same year. On 12 June 1948, the ship was sold to the Walter W. Johnson Co., for scrapping.

Awards
LST-939 earned one battle star for World War II service.

Notes

Citations

Bibliography 

Online resources

External links
 

 

1944 ships
LST-542-class tank landing ships
Ships built in Hingham, Massachusetts
World War II amphibious warfare vessels of the United States